Andrew Moore (born 6 October 1982) is a former speedway rider from England.

Speedway career
He rode in the top tier of British Speedway riding for the Swindon Robins during the 2007 Elite League speedway season. He began his British career riding for Sheffield Tigers in 1999 and reached the final of two consecutive British Speedway Championships in 2004 and 2005.

References 

1982 births
Living people
British speedway riders
Sheffield Tigers riders
Swindon Robins riders